The City Council of Pontevedra (Galician: Concello de Pontevedra; Spanish: Ayuntamiento de Pontevedra) is the top-tier administrative and governing body of the municipality of Pontevedra, Spain. The current Mayor of Pontevedra is Miguel Anxo Fernández Lores, in office since 4 July 1999.

The City Council is composed by three bodies: the Mayor who leads the City Council; the executive branch, the Governing Council, composed by the Mayor and the councillors appointed by him; and the Plenary, a democratically elected assembly which represents the people of Pontevedra. The Mayor is elected by the members of the plenary among its members the day the new municipal corporation is formed after the local election.

Since 1880, the City Council is headquartered at the Pontevedra City Hall. Since 2010, its central administrative services are housed in the Michelena 30 building. Also since 2010, and during a comprehensive reform of the City Hall, the council plenary sessions are held in the Principal Theatre.

Local Elections

Mayors
On 3 April 1979, the City Council was reconstituted as a democratic entity, with the first democratic elections during the Spanish transition to democracy. The Mayors since then are:

See also 
 Local government in Spain

References 

Pontevedra
Pontevedra